Tung Wah Group of Hospitals Fung Yiu King Hospital (TWGHs Fung Yiu King Hospital in short) is Charity Hospital, It is geriatric service hospital is  under the Tung Wah Group of Hospitals in Sandy Bay on the Hong Kong Island in Hong Kong.

History
The hospital was known as Sandy Bay Infirmary in the 1970s. In 1986, the infirmary was renovated and expanded and soon renamed as Fung Yiu King Convalescent Hospital in 1987.  It is then renamed to TWGHs Fung Yiu King Hospital in 1994 as service shifted to rehabilitative treatment.

References

External links

Hospitals in Hong Kong
Fung Yiu King Hospital
Sandy Bay, Hong Kong
Hospitals with year of establishment missing